Players and pairs who neither have high enough rankings nor receive wild cards may participate in a qualifying tournament held one week before the annual Wimbledon Tennis Championships.

Seeds

  Kiki Bertens (first round)
  Pauline Parmentier (first round)
  Timea Bacsinszky (qualified)
  Michelle Larcher de Brito (qualified)
  Alexandra Dulgheru (second round)
  Danka Kovinić (qualifying competition)
  Claire Feuerstein (second round)
  Vesna Dolonc (first round)
  Nadiia Kichenok (first round)
  Lara Arruabarrena (first round)
  Zheng Saisai (first round)
  Luksika Kumkhum (second round)
  Magda Linette (first round)
  Estrella Cabeza Candela (first round)
  Victoria Duval (qualified)
  Tamira Paszek (qualified)
  Alla Kudryavtseva (qualified)
  Olivia Rogowska (first round)
  Sofia Arvidsson (first round)
  Verónica Cepede Royg (qualifying competition)
  Alexandra Panova (first round)
  Grace Min (second round)
  Aleksandra Wozniak (qualified)
  Maryna Zanevska (second round)

Qualifiers

  Alla Kudryavtseva
  Tereza Smitková
  Timea Bacsinszky
  Michelle Larcher de Brito
  Aleksandra Wozniak
  Lesia Tsurenko
  Paula Kania
  Ana Konjuh
  Victoria Duval
  Tamira Paszek
  Anett Kontaveit
  Andreea Mitu

Qualifying draw

First qualifier

Second qualifier

Third qualifier

Fourth qualifier

Fifth qualifier

Sixth qualifier

Seventh qualifier

Eighth qualifier

Ninth qualifier

Tenth qualifier

Eleventh qualifier

Twelfth qualifier

External links

2014 Wimbledon Championships on WTAtennis.com
2014 Wimbledon Championships – Women's draws and results at the International Tennis Federation

Women's Singles Qualifying
Wimbledon Championship by year – Women's singles qualifying
Wimbledon Championships